The Basilica of Our Lady of the Immaculate Conception, known widely as the "Upper Church", is a Roman Catholic church and minor basilica within the Sanctuary of Our Lady of Lourdes in France. Constructed between 1862 and 1871 and consecrated in 1876, it was the second of the churches to be completed. The church was built on top of the rock above the Grotto and next to the Basilica of our Lady of the Rosary .

Designed by architect Hippolyte Durand, the Neo-Gothic church seems to emerge directly from the rock of Massabielle.

Exterior 
The exterior is dominated by a  spire, and two lesser spires (not completed until 1908). Above the entrance is a mosaic depicting Pope Pius IX, who defined the dogma of the Immaculate Conception in 1854.

The clock plays the Ave Maria hourly, and chimes the hours with a 2-tonne bell called Jeanne-Alphonsine. The other bells in the tower are named Geneviève-Félicie (weighing 1800 kg), Hermine-Benoîte (1100 kg), and Cécile-Gastine (800 kg).

Interior 
The walls are lined with ex voto plaques, and banners from official National Pilgrimages of the past. It has a series of stained glass windows depicting various events in the story of Lourdes, and the clerestory windows depict Mary as the Second Eve.

Notes

Further reading
 Le Guide Officiel des Sanctuaires, Ed. Sanctuaires Notre Dame de Lourdes, .

Basilica churches in France
Our Lady of Lourdes
Churches completed in 1872
19th-century Roman Catholic church buildings in France
Churches in Hautes-Pyrénées